The  is a railway line in Japan operated by the private railway operator Tokyu Corporation.

Stations
All-stations "Local" services are classified as blue and green. The latter runs on the express track between Futako-Tamagawa and Mizonokuchi and does not stop at Futako-Shinchi or Takatsu. Limited-stop "Express" services are also provided.

Rolling stock

Local services
 9000 series five-car EMUs
 9020 series five-car EMUs

Express services
 6000 series seven-car EMUs (since March 2008, originally delivered as six-car sets)
 6020 series seven-car EMUs (from March 2018)

Former rolling stock 
 8000 series
 8090 series
 8590 series
 8500 series

History

 15 January 1958: Electric supply was raised to 1,500 V DC.
 11 October 1963: The line was renamed the Den-en-toshi Line, together with the section south of Futako-Tamagawa.
 16 November 1977: Through running started between Shibuya and Nagatsuta.
 12 August 1979: The line was renamed the Ōimachi Line and separated from the Den-en-toshi Line south of Futako-Tamagawa.
 23 February 2008: ATS was replaced by ATC.
 28 March 2008: Express services started.

Since December 2018, "Q Seat" reserved seating has been implemented on some express services that run between Ōimachi and Nagatsuta stations.

References

External links
 Tokyu Corporation website 

Railway lines in Tokyo
Oimachi Line
Railway lines opened in 1927
1067 mm gauge railways in Japan